Eqbaliyeh (also Romanized as Eqbālīyeh) is a village in Tankaman Rural District, Tankaman District, Nazarabad County, Alborz Province, Iran. At the time of the 2006 census, its population consisted of 494 individuals in 123 families.

References 

Populated places in Nazarabad County